Puanama sara is a species of beetle in the family Cerambycidae. It was described by Galileo and Martins in 1998. It is known from Bolivia.

References

Eupromerini
Beetles described in 1998